Charles Hutton may refer to:

 Charles Hutton, mathematician
 Charles Hutton (architect)
 Charles Hutton (politician), Canadian politician
 Charles William Hutton, South African politician
 Charles Hutton Gregory, civil engineer